Li Dongxiao (born November 26, 1987) is a Chinese field hockey player. She competed for the China women's national field hockey team at the 2016 Summer Olympics.

She won a silver medal as a member of the Chinese team at 2014 Asian Games.

References

External links
 
 
 
 

1987 births
Living people
Chinese female field hockey players
Female field hockey goalkeepers
Asian Games medalists in field hockey
Asian Games gold medalists for China
Asian Games silver medalists for China
Field hockey players at the 2010 Asian Games
Field hockey players at the 2014 Asian Games
Field hockey players at the 2016 Summer Olympics
Field hockey players at the 2020 Summer Olympics
Medalists at the 2010 Asian Games
Medalists at the 2014 Asian Games
Olympic field hockey players of China
Sportspeople from Jilin City